"Do Not Go Gently" may refer to:
"Do Not Go Gently", an episode of the series Poltergeist: The Legacy
"Do Not Go Gently", a song by Animals as Leaders from the album Weightless

See also
Do not go gentle into that good night